Oculus Touch is the motion controller system used by Reality Labs in their Rift CV, Rift S, Quest, and Quest 2 virtual reality systems. Three iterations of the controllers have been developed; the first for use in the original Oculus Rift, which uses external tracking, and the second one for use with the Rift S and the Oculus Quest, which use inside-out tracking, and the third, for use with the Meta Quest 2, resembling the second models, but with a similar grip and button layout to the first.

Hardware
The Oculus Touch consists of a pair of handheld units, each featuring an analog stick, three buttons, and two triggers, (one commonly used for grabbing and the other for shooting or firing), along with the first and third iterations having a dedicated thumbrest. and features a system for detecting finger gestures the user may make while holding them. The ring in each controller contains a set of infrared LEDs, which allows the controllers to be fully tracked in 3D space by the Oculus Rift's Constellation tracking system or the Oculus Insight tracking system in later models, allowing them to be represented in the virtual environment. Each controller features a rumble motor for haptic feedback and is powered by a single AA alkaline cell. The fourth iteration adopted infrared cameras to track themselves around your space.

Products

First iteration
The first iteration of Oculus Touch was revealed on June 11, 2015, with a prototype called the Half Moon. The prototype used the same infrared LED tracking technology as the Oculus Rift and included inward-facing sensors which could detect common hand gestures.

Since the Oculus Rift was initially shipped without motion controllers, the Oculus Touch was first released as a standalone accessory for the Rift. Pre-orders for Oculus Touch began on October 10, 2016, with priority granted until October 27 to those who had originally pre-ordered the Oculus Rift. The device was finally released on December 6, 2016. Besides the two controllers, this standalone bundle included an extra Constellation sensor, to accompany the one included with the first release of the Oculus Rift. Later, in August 2017, the standard Rift bundle was modified, the Oculus Touch, with its second sensor, became an integral part of the Oculus Rift bundle.

Second iteration

A second iteration of the controller was released in March 2019, included with both the Oculus Rift S and the Oculus Quest. The most prominent modification is that, now designed to work with the Oculus Insight inside-out tracking system, the controllers' IR rings were moved to the top of the device facing the user to ensure their visibility from the headset's tracking cameras.  Due to an oversight, the first batch of these controllers made it to developers and even retail including an "easter egg" message inside the controllers.

Third iteration

A third iteration was included with the Meta Quest 2, including a similar design to the first Oculus Touch controllers, but with a white color, better ergonomics, and improved battery life along with enhanced haptics. This iteration brought back the dedicated thumb rest after it was removed from the second iteration of the Oculus Touch controllers. This iteration also features a snap mechanism for the battery latch as opposed to the magnetic battery latch on the first and second revision to prevent the battery door randomly slipping off during intense gameplay. The controller has been criticized for being less accurate than the previous revision.

Touch Pro 
The fourth iteration of Oculus Touch—branded as Touch Pro—was unveiled in October 2022. They are included with the Meta Quest Pro and are also available as an optional accessory for the Quest 2. They have a smaller form factor than the existing Oculus Touch controllers, accomplished primarily by replacing the infrared sensor ring with cameras used for on-board motion tracking. As a result, they no longer experience degraded accuracy when outside of the headset's line-of-sight. To facilitate this feature, the controllers now include Qualcomm Snapdragon 662 processors. The controller also has a pressure sensor designed to detect pinching gestures, and rechargeable batteries.

References

American inventions
Oculus VR
Products introduced in 2016
Game controllers